The 18 municipalities of the region of South Ostrobothnia in Finland are divided on four sub-regions.

Järviseutu sub-region 
Alajärvi
Evijärvi
Lappajärvi
Vimpeli (Vindala)

Kuusiokunnat sub-region 
Alavus (Alavo)
Kuortane
Soini
Ähtäri (Etseri)

Seinäjoki sub-region 
Ilmajoki (Ilmola)
Isokyrö (Storkyro)
Kauhava
Kurikka
Lapua (Lappo)
Seinäjoki

South Eastern Bothnia sub-region 
Isojoki (Storå)
Karijoki (Bötom)
Kauhajoki
Teuva (Östermark)

See also 
Western Finland
Regions of Western Finland

External links